Zhu Yaming (born 4 May 1994) is a Chinese male triple jumper. He is the 2017 Asian champion in the event.

Zhu began competing nationally in triple jump in 2015 and reached elite level in the 2017 outdoor season.

At the 2018 Asian Games he finished eighth.

Zhu competed in the Tokyo 2020 Olympic Games and on 5 August 2021 won the Silver medal in the Triple Jump.

References

Living people
1994 births
Chinese male triple jumpers
Athletes (track and field) at the 2018 Asian Games
Asian Games competitors for China
Athletes (track and field) at the 2020 Summer Olympics
Medalists at the 2020 Summer Olympics
Olympic silver medalists for China
Olympic silver medalists in athletics (track and field)
Olympic athletes of China